The Miraculous Journey of Edward Tulane is a 2006 novel by Kate DiCamillo and illustrated by Bagram Ibatoulline. Following the life of a china rabbit, the book won the 2006 Boston Globe-Horn Book Award in Fiction category.

Plot
Edward Tulane is a china rabbit given to a ten-year-old girl named Abilene by her grandmother in the 1930s. He enjoys a pleasant but vain life with his young mistress, who treats him with the utmost love and respect until an unfortunate incident finds him falling overboard while vacationing on the Queen Mary. Edward spends 297 days on the ocean floor, until a storm frees him from the seabed and a passing fisherman and his buddy pull him from their fishing net. The man takes him home to his wife where he is referred to as female and wears dresses.

Edward is passed from hand to hand of a succession of life-altering characters, such as a hobo and his dog and a four-year-old girl with tuberculosis and her brother. Edward's journeys not only take him far from home, but even farther from the selfish rabbit he once was. Eventually, Edward is cruelly broken against a counter top edge, repaired and then offered for sale in a doll store for several years. He is finally bought by Abilene, his original owner, now married with a daughter of her own.

Themes 
The novel contains several themes involving loss and recovery, kindness and compassion, and the journey to self-discovery. The main theme can be summarized by a quote from the book:  "If you have no intention of loving or being loved, then the whole journey is pointless."

The novel has often been compared to Hans Christian Andersen's work, particularly "The Steadfast Tin Soldier".

Awards, nominations, and recognition
The Miraculous Journey won the 2006 Boston Globe–Horn Book Award for children's fiction and a 
Parents' Choice Award for Spring 2006 fiction. 
It was a Quill Awards finalist in the children's chapter book category.

In 2007 the U.S. National Education Association named it one of "Teachers' Top 100 Books for Children" based on an  online poll. In 2012 it was ranked number 59 among all-time children's novels in a survey published by School Library Journal – the third of three books by DiCamillo in the Top 100.

Adaptations 
On October 30, 2013, Robert Zemeckis was set to direct and produce the film adaptation of The Miraculous Journey of Edward Tulane for New Line Cinema with Jeff Stockwell writing the script. The Minnesota Opera commissioned 'Edward Tulane', with Paola Prestini composing the music for the new opera. 'Edward Tulane' was scheduled to run at the Ordway Center for Performing Arts from Saturday, March 21 through Sunday, March 29, 2020, but the run was postponed due to the COVID-19 pandemic.  Synchronicity Theatre in Atlanta produced the stage production in April 2018, and again in December 2022.

In popular culture
The book was featured in My Love from the Star, a 2014 Korean drama about an alien living on Earth for 400 years who falls in love with a popular actress. This propelled the novel to the top of the bestseller lists in major Korean bookstores as the alien repeatedly quotes from it throughout the series.

The book was also quoted at a memorial service for Lil Peep by his mother.

Notes

External links
Edward Tulane publisher's website

2006 American novels
American young adult novels
Books about rabbits and hares
Candlewick Press books
Novels adapted into operas
Sentient toys in fiction